William Hazao Owusu (born 13 September 1991) is a Ghanaian footballer who plays for Turkish Cypriot club Gençlik Gücü.

Career
William played for Sekondi Wise Fighters in the 2009/10 season Ghana Premier League season, finishing 15th in the 2009/10 Ghana Premier League season. Eli Guttman, then Hapoel Tel Aviv's Manager, enthusiastic young talents called him and asked to purchase long-term investment. After F.C. Ashdod wanted him, and they signed William as a Hapoel player to help the talented team in the league as a temporary player replacement, but after the team was unable to sign their fifth 1st choice foreign player, it was decided William will be the fifth foreign player. In January 2011, William went on loan to Sektzia Ness Ziona, playing in the second division of Israeli football.

References

1991 births
Living people
Ghanaian footballers
Hapoel Tel Aviv F.C. players
Sektzia Ness Ziona F.C. players
F.C. Ashdod players
Hapoel Kfar Saba F.C. players
Beitar Tel Aviv Bat Yam F.C. players
Hapoel Nof HaGalil F.C. players
Israeli Premier League players
Liga Leumit players
Ghanaian expatriate sportspeople in Israel
Association football midfielders